Kuttanad State assembly constituency  is one of the 140 state legislative assembly constituencies at the state Kerala in southern India. It is also one of the 7 state legislative assembly constituencies included in the Mavelikara Lok Sabha constituency.

Local self governed segments
Kuttanad Niyamasabha constituency is composed of the following local self governed segments:

Members of Legislative Assembly
Key

Brief election history

Detailed election results
Percentage change (±%) denotes the change in the number of votes from the immediate previous election.

Niyama Sabha Election 2016
There were 1,65,172 eligible voters in Kuttanad Constituency for the 2016 Kerala Niyama Sabha Election.

Partywise Results

Local Self Governed segment wise Results 2016 
The Local Self Governed segment wise result of 2016 Niyamasabha election is as follows:

Niyama Sabha Election 2011
There were 1,50,213 eligible voters in Kuttanad Constituency for the 2011 Kerala Niyama Sabha Election.

See also
 Kuttanad
 Alappuzha district
 List of constituencies of the Kerala Legislative Assembly
 2016 Kerala Legislative Assembly election

References 

Assembly constituencies of Kerala

State assembly constituencies in Alappuzha district
1965 establishments in Kerala